Sir James Esdaile (1714–1793) was an English banker who served as the Lord Mayor of London in 1777. His grandfather was Baron d'Esdaile who fled from France in an attempt to avoid persecution by Louis XIV.

He was Sheriff of London in 1767. His daughter Louisa married Benjamin Hammet (later M.P. for Taunton), who became a protege of Esdaile's. In 1781 he took Hammet into his banking firm, which became 'Esdaile and Hammet'.

1714 births
1793 deaths
Sheriffs of the City of London
18th-century lord mayors of London